Kirk means "church", often referring to the Church of Scotland in particular.

Kirk or KIRK may also refer to:
 James T. Kirk, a fictional character from the Star Trek franchise and TV series

Places 
 Kirk (placename element)
 Kirk, Azerbaijan
 Kirk, Ontario, Canada
 Kirk, California, United States; now Kirkwood
 Kirk, Colorado, United States
 Kirk, Oregon, United States
 Kirk, West Virginia, United States
Kirk (crater), crater on Charon, the primary moon and double planet of dwarf planet Pluto

Facilities and structures
The Kirk (Mason City, Iowa), U.S.A., a historic apartment building
Kirksville Regional Airport, a public-use airport in Missouri, United States

People 
Kirk (given name)
Kirk (surname)

Other uses 
KIRK (FM), a radio station licensed to Macon, Missouri, United States
Kirk (TV series), a 1990s American sitcom
, a U.S. frigate of the Knox class
 Kirk telecom A/S, a former Danish manufacturer of telephones, which was taken over by SpectraLink Corporation, then Polycom
Kirk (album), an album by DaBaby

See also

 
 KRK (disambiguation)